"Big Black Dog" is a single released in 1970 by English rock band Humble Pie, one of the first British supergroups which formed in 1969. It was the band's first single for A&M Records and the follow-up single  to "Natural Born Bugie" (1969). It was written by the band's guitarist, Peter Frampton.

The B-side, "Strange Days" is credited to Steve Marriott and Humble Pie. It later appeared on the group's fourth album Rock On. In Germany, the B-side was "Only a Roach", which was an ode to cannabis, written and sung by drummer Jerry Shirley.

Credits
Steve Marriott - guitar, vocals
Peter Frampton - guitar, vocals
Greg Ridley - bass guitar, vocals
Jerry Shirley - drums

References

External links
Humble Pie.net

1970 singles
Humble Pie (band) songs
Songs written by Peter Frampton
1970 songs
A&M Records singles